Computational anatomy (CA) is the study of shape and form in medical imaging. The study of deformable shapes in computational anatomy rely on high-dimensional diffeomorphism groups  which generate orbits of the form . In CA, this orbit is in general considered a smooth Riemannian manifold
since at every point of the manifold  there is an  inner product inducing the norm  on the tangent space
that varies smoothly from point to point in the manifold of shapes . This is generated by viewing the
This induces the norm and metric on the orbit  under the action from the group of diffeomorphisms.

The diffeomorphisms group generated as Lagrangian and Eulerian flows
The diffeomorphisms in computational anatomy are generated to satisfy the Lagrangian and Eulerian specification of the flow fields, generated via the ordinary differential equation

and the  Jacobian matrix for flows in   given as 

To ensure smooth flows of diffeomorphisms with inverse,  the vector fields  must be at least 1-time continuously differentiable in space which are modelled as elements of the Hilbert space   using the Sobolev embedding theorems so that each element  has 3-square-integrable derivatives thusly implies  embeds smoothly in 1-time continuously differentiable functions.  The diffeomorphism group are flows with vector fields absolutely integrable in Sobolev norm:

The Riemannian orbit model
Shapes in Computational Anatomy (CA) are studied via the use of diffeomorphic mapping for establishing correspondences between anatomical coordinate systems. In this setting, 3-dimensional medical images are modelled as diffemorphic transformations of some exemplar, termed the template , resulting in the observed images to be elements of the random orbit model of CA.

The Riemannian metric
The orbit of shapes and forms in Computational Anatomy  are generated by the group action.   This is made into a Riemannian orbit by introducing a metric associated to each point and associated tangent space. For this a metric is defined on the group which induces the metric on the orbit. Take as the metric for  Computational anatomy at each element of the tangent space  in the group of diffeomorphisms 
, 
with the vector fields modelled to be in a Hilbert space with the norm in the Hilbert space . We model  as a reproducing kernel Hilbert space (RKHS) defined by a 1-1, differential operator. For  a distribution or generalized function, the linear form  determines the norm:and inner product for  according to 

where the integral is calculated by integration by parts for  a generalized function  the dual-space.
The differential operator is selected so that the Green's kernel associated to the inverse is sufficiently smooth so that the vector fields support 1-continuous derivative.

The right-invariant metric on diffeomorphisms
The metric on the group of diffeomorphisms is defined by the distance as defined on pairs of elements in the group of diffeomorphisms according to

This distance provides a right-invariant metric of diffeomorphometry, invariant to reparameterization of space since for all ,

The Lie bracket in the group of diffeomorphisms
The Lie bracket gives the adjustment of the velocity term resulting from a perturbation of the motion in the setting of curved spaces. Using Hamilton's principle of least-action derives the optimizing flows as a critical point for the action integral of the integral of the kinetic energy. The Lie bracket for vector fields in Computational Anatomy was first introduced in Miller, Trouve and Younes. The derivation calculates the perturbation  on the vector fields
   in terms of the derivative in time of the group perturbation  adjusted by the correction of the Lie bracket of vector fields in this function setting involving the Jacobian matrix, unlike the matrix group case:

Proof:
Proving Lie bracket of vector fields take a first order perturbation of the flow at point .

The Lie bracket gives the first order variation of the vector field with respect to first order variation of the flow.

The generalized Euler–Lagrange equation for the metric on diffeomorphic flows 

The Euler–Lagrange equation can be used to calculate geodesic flows through the group which form the basis for the metric. The action integral for the Lagrangian of the kinetic energy for Hamilton's principle becomes 

The action integral in terms of the vector field corresponds to integrating the kinetic energy

The shortest paths geodesic connections in the orbit are defined via Hamilton's Principle of least action requires first order variations of the solutions in the orbits of Computational Anatomy which are based on computing critical points on the metric length or energy of the path.
The original derivation of the Euler equation associated to the geodesic flow of diffeomorphisms exploits the was a generalized function equation when is a distribution, or generalized function, take the first order variation of the action integral using the adjoint operator for the Lie bracket gives for all smooth , 

Using the bracket  and  gives
meaning for all smooth 

Equation is the Euler-equation when diffeomorphic shape momentum is a generalized function.

This equation has been called EPDiff, Euler–Poincare equation for diffeomorphisms and  has been studied in the context of fluid mechanics for incompressible fluids with  metric.

Riemannian exponential for positioning
In the random orbit model of Computational anatomy, the entire flow is reduced to the initial condition which forms the coordinates encoding the diffeomorphism, as well as providing the means of positioning information in the orbit. This was first terms a geodesic positioning system in Miller, Trouve, and Younes. From the initial condition  then geodesic positioning  with respect to the Riemannian metric of Computational anatomy solves for the flow of the Euler–Lagrange equation. Solving the geodesic from the initial condition  is termed the Riemannian-exponential, a mapping  at identity to the group.

The Riemannian exponential satisfies  for initial condition , vector field dynamics ,  
 for classical equation on the diffeomorphic shape momentum as a smooth vector  with  the Euler equation exists in the classical sense as first derived for the density:

 for generalized equation, then  

It is
extended to the entire group,
.

The variation problem for matching or registering coordinate system information in computational anatomy

Matching information across coordinate systems is central to computational anatomy. Adding a matching term  to the action integral of Equation
which represents the target endpoint 

The endpoint term adds a boundary condition for the Euler–Lagrange equation
which gives the Euler equation with boundary term. Taking the variation gives
Necessary geodesic condition:
 

Proof: The Proof via variation calculus uses the perturbations from above and classic calculus of variation arguments.

Euler–Lagrange geodesic endpoint conditions for image matching
The earliest large deformation diffeomorphic metric mapping (LDDMM) algorithms solved matching problems associated to images and registered landmarks.   are in a vector spaces. The image matching geodesic equation satisfies the classical dynamical equation with endpoint condition. The necessary conditions for the geodesic for image matching takes the form of the classic Equation of Euler–Lagrange with boundary condition:

Necessary geodesic condition:

Euler–Lagrange geodesic endpoint conditions for landmark matching
The registered landmark matching problem satisfies the dynamical equation for generalized functions with endpoint condition:

 Necessary geodesic conditions:
 
Proof:

The variation  requires variation of the inverse  generalizes the matrix perturbation of the inverse  via  giving  

giving

References

Computational anatomy
Geometry
Fluid mechanics
Neural engineering
Biomedical engineering